Leigh Court Barn is a cruck framed barn at Leigh, Worcestershire, England, built in the early fourteenth century to store produce for Pershore Abbey. Radiocarbon dating places its construction about 1325.

References 

Buildings and structures completed in 1325
Barns in England
Grade I listed buildings in Worcestershire
Timber framed buildings in England
Tithe barns in Europe
Grade I listed agricultural buildings
Malvern Hills